Harvey Earl Wilson (May 3, 1907 – January 16, 1987) was an American journalist, gossip columnist, and author, perhaps best known for his 6-day a week nationally syndicated newspaper column, It Happened Last Night.

Early life and career
Wilson was born in Rockford, in Mercer County in western Ohio, to Arthur Wilson, a farmer, and Chloe Huffman Wilson. He attended Central High, where he reported on the doings of the school, using his father's typewriter to write his stories. Young Earl's mother encouraged him to pursue a career outside of farming. Wilson contributed to the Rockford Press and the Lima Republican Gazette, which would be the first to pay him for his writing. He also wrote for the Piqua, Ohio Daily Call before enrolling in college in 1925. Wilson attended Heidelberg College for two years before transferring to Ohio State University where he worked on The Lantern, the university's student-run daily newspaper. He also held part-time jobs with the Columbus Dispatch and the capital city’s International News Service Bureau. Wilson graduated from Ohio State University in 1931 with a B. S. in journalism.

In 1935, Wilson began work for The Washington Post, meanwhile sending samples of his work to one of the editors at the New York Post. Later in 1935, Wilson arrived in New York to begin work with the Post, taking a room in a boarding house on Bleecker Street. There he met Rosemary Lyons from East St. Louis, IL, a secretary whom he wed in 1936. The couple struggled for several years until Wilson's work at the Post began to take off.

Their only child, Earl Wilson Jr., was born on December 1, 1942. His column, which he took over from a writer who went off to war in 1942, was originally considered "filler". It eventually ran until 1983. As the column grew in popularity and importance, Wilson worked 18-hour days, typically arising in the late morning, telephoning news sources, and taking reports from several assistants. In the evenings he would set out for dinner at Toots Shor's or a similar theater district restaurant, accompanied by his wife, Rosemary, known to his readers as "B.W." (originally short for Barefoot Wife but when she objected he changed it to Beautiful Wife). The pair made the rounds of night spots until the wee hours of the morning.

Broadway coverage
By the early 1950s, the Broadway gossip columns had become an important media outlet; columnists exercised a great deal of power in providing publicity for the celebrities of the day. But, whereas gossip columnists as a group were not held in high regard, Wilson had the reputation of being different: he was a trained journalist who double-checked facts, he was much influenced by his Mid-western upbringing and avoided innuendo and sensationalism, and he sought to cover his stories as real news items. With a reputation for being fair and honest, Wilson was trusted so much that celebrities willingly gave him their stories.

His chronicling of the Broadway theatre scene during the "Golden Age" of show business formed the basis for a book published in 1971, The Show Business Nobody Knows. He signed his columns with the tag line, "That's Earl, brother." His nickname was "Midnight Earl". In later years, the name of his column was changed to Last Night With Earl Wilson. In his final years with the Post, he alternated with the paper's entertainment writer and restaurant critic, Martin Burden, in turning out the column. (Burden, who died in 1993, took over the Last Night column full-time upon Wilson's retirement.)

Wilson is also the author of two books, Show Business Laid Bare, and an unauthorized biography of Frank Sinatra, Sinatra: An Unauthorized Biography. The former book is notable for revealing the extramarital affairs of President John F. Kennedy.

Appearances on television and in films
In the early 1950s, Wilson was an occasional panelist on the NBC game show Who Said That?, in which celebrities tried to determine the speaker of quotations taken from recent news reports.

On January 19, 1952, Wilson guest-starred on the CBS live variety show Faye Emerson's Wonderful Town, in which hostess Faye Emerson visited Columbus to accent the kinds of music popular in the Ohio capital city.

Wilson appeared in a few films as himself, notably Copacabana (1947) with Groucho Marx and Carmen Miranda, A Face in the Crowd (1957) with Andy Griffith, College Confidential (1960), Beach Blanket Bingo (1965) with Buster Keaton, Paul Lynde and Don Rickles, and Where Were You When the Lights Went Out? (1968) with Doris Day. Wilson also hosted the DuMont TV show Stage Entrance from May 1951 to March 1952.

Death
Wilson, at age 79, died at St. Joseph's Hospital in Yonkers, New York on January 16, 1987. Having battled Parkinson's disease for several years, he suffered a stroke approximately six days earlier.

His was survived by his only child, Earl Wilson Jr., a songwriter for the musical theatre. Wilson Sr.'s wife, Rosemary, predeceased him February 23, 1986.

Legacy
Ed Sullivan dedicated The Beatles first set on the Ed Sullivan Show to Johnny Carson, Randy Paar and Earl Wilson.
Wilson was portrayed by Christian McKay in the 2016 film Florence Foster Jenkins.

References
Notes

Bibliography
Riley, Sam G. Biographical Dictionary of American Newspaper Columnists.  Westport, CT, Greenwood Press, 1995.
"Jack Kennedy's Other Women."  Time, Dec. 29, 1975

External links

Actors Cabaret of Eugene News - about Earl Wilson, Jr., with some information on Earl Wilson
Creative Quotations from Earl Wilson
Obituary in The New York Times, January 17, 1987.
Obituary in The New York Times of his wife, Rosemary (published February 26, 1986); the "B.W." (Beautiful Wife) he referred to in his columns

1907 births
1987 deaths
American male journalists
American gossip columnists
People from Mercer County, Ohio
People from Yonkers, New York
Heidelberg University (Ohio) alumni
Ohio State University School of Communication alumni
Journalists from New York (state)
New York Post people
20th-century American non-fiction writers
Journalists from Ohio
20th-century American male writers
20th-century American journalists